Georges Michel (12 January 1763 – 7 or 8 June 1843) was a French landscape painter. An important precursor of the Barbizon school, Michel was practically unknown during his lifetime, and worked as copyist and restorer.

Michel was born in Paris. His father was an employee at Les Halles, a large marketplace in the central part of the city. Michel's first patron, at a very early age, was a certain Monsieur de Chalue. His first painting teacher was one Leduc, a history painter, and later Michel studied under Nicolas-Antoine Taunay. Although he exhibited at the Paris Salon, he failed to achieve recognition and earned his living by working as copyist and restorer; he specialized in Dutch paintings and was helped in business by Élisabeth-Louise Vigée-Le Brun's husband.

Most of Michel's work concentrates on rural landscapes in the area around Paris. He was influenced by Dutch landscape painters such as Jacob van Ruisdael and Meindert Hobbema. Michel worked in oil and watercolor with equal facility. He was forgotten for decades after his death; the first large exhibition of his work was presented by the Parisian Jean Charpentier hotel, in 1927. Today his works are found in museums around the world, including The Metropolitan Museum of Art, Portland Art Museum, Vanderbilt University Gallery, Strasbourg Musée des Beaux-Arts, Victoria and Albert Museum, and many others.

References

Further reading
 Chilvers, Ian. "Michel, Georges" in The Oxford Dictionary of Art, 2004.
 Lanoë, Georges and Brice, Tristan. Histoire de l'école française de paysage (depuis le Poussin jusqu'à Millet), Paris: A. Charles, 1901.
 Larguier, Léo. "Georges Michel (1763–1843)" in Les petits maîtres français, Delpeuch, Paris, 1927.
 Sensier, Alfred. Étude sur Georges Michel, Paris: Lemerre, 1873.

External links

Works by Georges Michel (artcyclopedia.com)
 Gallery of works by Georges Michel in French collections

French landscape painters
Artists from Paris
1763 births
1843 deaths